Zhibek Zholy (until 1990: Chernyaevka, 1990–1993: Poltoratskoye) is a village in Saryagash District, Turkestan Region, Kazakhstan. It lies on the border with Uzbekistan, across from the Uzbek village Gʻishtkoʻprik (Tashkent District). It is on the northern Uzbek-Kazakh frontier, some 50 km from the Uzbek capital of Tashkent.

References

External links

Kazakhstan–Uzbekistan border
Populated places in Turkistan Region